Events in the year 1939 in Turkey.

Parliament
 5th Parliament of Turkey (up to 3 April)
 6th Parliament of Turkey

Incumbents
President – İsmet İnönü
Prime Minister 
 Celal Bayar
Refik Saydam

Ruling party and the main opposition
 Ruling party – Republican People's Party (CHP)

Cabinet
10th government of Turkey (up to 25 January)
11th government of Turkey (25 January – 3 April) 
12th government of Turkey (from 3 April)

Events
25 January – Prime minister Celal Bayar resigned. İsmet İnönü appointed Refik Saydam as the new prime minister *26 March – General elections
26 June – Hatay Republic decided to merge to Turkey
23 July – The last of the French military troops left Hatay
22 September – Dikili Earthquake.46 deaths
19 October – Defensive alliance with United Kingdom and France
27/28 December – The 7.8  Erzincan earthquake shakes eastern Turkey with a maximum Mercalli intensity of XII (Extreme), causing $20 million in damage, and leaving 32,700–32,968 dead.

Births
10 February – Enver Ören, business man, newspaper owner
11 February – Okay Temiz, musician
10 June – Ahmet Taner Kışlalı, academic, politician
25 July – Filiz Dinçmen, first female ambassador of Turkey
31 October – Çiğdem Talu, lyricist
2 December – Özcan Arkoç, goalkeeper
27 December – Leyla Sayar, actress

Deaths
19 May – Ahmet Ağaoğlu (born in 1869), journalist
25 September – Ali Saip Ursavaş (1887), politician
20 December – Yakup Şevki Subaşı (born in 1876), retired general
25 December – Ömer Halis Bıyıktay (born in 1883), retired general

Gallery

References

 
Years of the 20th century in Turkey
Turkey
Turkey
Turkey